Lewis Wickes Hine (September 26, 1874 – November 3, 1940) was an American sociologist and muckraker photographer. His photographs were instrumental in bringing about the passage of the first child labor laws in the United States.

Early life
Hine was born in Oshkosh, Wisconsin, on September 26, 1874. After his father was killed in an accident,  Hine began working and saved his money for a college education. He studied sociology at the University of Chicago, Columbia University and New York University. He became a teacher in New York City at the Ethical Culture School, where he encouraged his students to use photography as an educational medium.

Hine led his sociology classes to Ellis Island in New York Harbor, photographing the thousands of immigrants who arrived each day. Between 1904 and 1909, Hine took over 200 plates (photographs) and came to the realization that documentary photography could be employed as a tool for social change and reform.

Documentary photography
In 1907, Hine became the staff photographer of the Russell Sage Foundation; he photographed life in the steel-making districts and people of Pittsburgh, Pennsylvania, for the influential sociological study called The Pittsburgh Survey.

In 1908, Hine became the photographer for the National Child Labor Committee (NCLC), leaving his teaching position. Over the next decade, Hine documented child labor, with focus on the use of child labor in the Carolina Piedmont, to aid the NCLC's lobbying efforts to end the practice.<ref>The American Quarterly, 'Lewis Hine: From "Social" to "Interpretive" Photographer, Peter Seixas]</ref> In 1913, he documented child laborers among cotton mill workers with a series of Francis Galton's composite portraits.

Hine's work for the NCLC was often dangerous. As a photographer, he was frequently threatened with violence or even death by factory police and foremen. At the time, the immorality of child labor was meant to be hidden from the public. Photography was not only prohibited but also posed a serious threat to the industry. To gain entry to the mills, mines and factories, Hine was forced to assume many guises. At times he was a fire inspector, postcard vendor, bible salesman, or even an industrial photographer making a record of factory machinery.

During and after World War I, he photographed American Red Cross relief work in Europe. In the 1920s and early 1930s, Hine made a series of "work portraits," which emphasized the human contribution to modern industry. In 1930, Hine was commissioned to document the construction of the Empire State Building. He photographed the workers in precarious positions while they secured the steel framework of the structure, taking many of the same risks that the workers endured. To obtain the best vantage points, Hine was swung out in a specially-designed basket 1,000 ft above Fifth Avenue. At times, he remembered, he hung above the city with nothing below but "a sheer drop of nearly a quarter-mile."

During the Great Depression Hine again worked for the Red Cross, photographing drought relief in the American South, and for the Tennessee Valley Authority (TVA), documenting life in the mountains of eastern Tennessee. He also served as chief photographer for the Works Progress Administration's National Research Project, which studied changes in industry and their effect on employment. Hine was also a faculty member of the Ethical Culture Fieldston School.

Later life
In 1936, Hine was selected as the photographer for the National Research Project of the Works Projects Administration, but his work there was not completed.

The last years of his life were filled with professional struggles by loss of government and corporate patronage. Hine hoped to join the Farm Security Administration photography project, but despite writing repeatedly to Roy Stryker, Stryker always refused. Few people were interested in his work, past or present, and Hine lost his house and applied for welfare. He died on November 3, 1940, at Dobbs Ferry Hospital in Dobbs Ferry, New York, after an operation. He was 66 years old.

Legacy
Hine's photographs supported the NCLC's lobbying to end child labor, and in 1912 the Children's Bureau was created. The Fair Labor Standards Act of 1938 eventually brought child labour in the US to an end.

After Hine's death, his son Corydon donated his prints and negatives to the Photo League, which was dismantled in 1951. The Museum of Modern Art was offered his pictures and did not accept them, but the George Eastman Museum did.

In 2006, author Elizabeth Winthrop Alsop's historical fiction middle-grade novel, Counting on Grace was published by Wendy Lamb Books. The latter chapters center on 12-year-old Grace and her life-changing encounter with Hine, during his 1910 visit to a Vermont cotton mill known to have many child laborers. On the cover is the iconic photo of Grace's real-life counterpart, Addie Card (1897–1993), taken during Hine's undercover visit to the Pownal Cotton Mill.

In 2016, Time published colorized versions of several of Hine's photographs of child labor in the US.

Collections

Hine's work is held in the following public collections:
Art Institute of Chicago, Chicago, IL
Albin O. Kuhn Library & Gallery of the University of Maryland, Baltimore County – almost five thousand NCLC photographs
George Eastman Museum – thousands of photographs and negatives
Library of Congress – over 5,000 photographs, including examples of Hine's child labor and Red Cross photographs, his work portraits, and his WPA and TVA images.
New York Public Library, New York
International Photography Hall of Fame, St.Louis, MO

Notable photographsYoung Doffers in the Elk Cotton Mills (1910)Steam Fitter (1920)Workers, Empire State Building (1931)

Gallery

See alsoHouse Calls (2006 film), a documentary about physician and photographer Mark Nowaczynski, who was inspired by Hine to photograph elderly patients.

References

Further reading
 Freedman, Russell. Kids at work: Lewis Hine and the crusade against child labor (Houghton Mifflin Harcourt, 1994).

 Macieski, Robert. Picturing class: Lewis W. Hine photographs child labor in New England (2015) online
 Sampsell-Willmann, Kate. Lewis Hine as social critic'' (Univ. Press of Mississippi, 2009). [https://books.google.com/books?id=iMOaXvVh-rcC&dq=lewis+hine+the&pg=PP13 excerpt

External links

Lewis Wickes Hine | University of Illinois
Photographs of Lewis Hine: Documentation of Child Labor | National Archives
David Joseph Marcou, 'Lewis Wickes Hine, 1874–1940: A Biographical Essay, with Photographs by Lewis Wickes Hine | University of Missouri

20th-century American photographers
American portrait photographers
Social documentary photographers
American sociologists
Child labor in the United States
People of the New Deal arts projects
Progressive Era in the United States
Works Progress Administration workers
Columbia University alumni
University of Chicago alumni
New York University alumni
People from Oshkosh, Wisconsin
Photographers from Wisconsin
1874 births
1940 deaths